Kotogatake Koichi (born 24 September 1952 as Yoshikazu Takeuchi) is a former sumo wrestler from Teshikaga, Hokkaidō, Japan. He made his professional debut in November 1967 and reached the top division in July 1976. His highest rank was maegashira 1. Upon retirement from active competition he became an elder in the Japan Sumo Association. He left the Sumo Association in March 1995.

Career record

See also
Glossary of sumo terms
List of past sumo wrestlers
List of sumo tournament second division champions

References

1952 births
Living people
Japanese sumo wrestlers
Sumo people from Hokkaido
Sadogatake stable sumo wrestlers